Antigona is a genus of saltwater clams, marine bivalve molluscs in the family Veneridae, the venus clams.

Species
 Antigona chemnitzii (Hanley, 1845)
 Antigona elimatula (Darragh, 2010)
 Antigona gladstonensis (Angas, 1872)
 Antigona lacerata (Hanley, 1845)
 Antigona lamellaris Schumacher, 1817
 Antigona laqueata (G. B. Sowerby II, 1853)
 Antigona magnifica (Hanley, 1845)
 Antigona persimilis (Iredale, 1930)
 Antigona resticulata (G. B. Sowerby II, 1853)
 Antigona somwangi M. Huber, 2010
 Antigona sowerbyi (Deshayes, 1854)

References

Veneridae
Bivalve genera